Runaway with Del Shannon is the 1961 debut album by American rock 'n' roll singer-songwriter Del Shannon. It was released shortly after and contains Shannon's best-known hit, "Runaway". It is regarded by critics as having helped bridge the period between early rock and the British Invasion.

Track listing

References

1961 debut albums
Del Shannon albums